In film, a match cut is a cut from one shot to another where the composition of the two shots are matched by the action or subject and subject matter. For example, in a duel a shot can go from a long shot on both contestants via a cut to a medium closeup shot of one of the duellists. The cut matches the two shots and is consistent with the logic of the action. This is a standard practice in  film-making, to produce a seamless reality-effect.

Wider context 
Match cuts form the basis for continuity editing, such as the ubiquitous use of match on action. Continuity editing smooths over the inherent discontinuity of shot changes to establish a logical coherence between shots. Even within continuity editing, though, the match cut is a contrast both with cross-cutting between actions in two different locations that are occurring simultaneously, and with parallel editing, which draws parallels or contrasts between two different time-space locations.

A graphic match (as opposed to a graphic contrast or collision) occurs when the shapes, colors and/or overall movement of two shots match in composition, either within a scene or, especially, across a transition between two scenes. Indeed, rather than the seamless cuts of continuity editing within a scene, the term "graphic match" usually denotes a more conspicuous transition between (or comparison of) two shots via pictorial elements. A match cut often involves a graphic match, a smooth transition between scenes and an element of metaphorical (or at least meaningful) comparison between elements in both shots.

A match cut contrasts with the conspicuous and abrupt discontinuity of a jump cut.

Notable examples 

Stanley Kubrick's 1968 film 2001: A Space Odyssey contains a famous example of a match cut. After an ape discovers the use of bones as a tool and a weapon, he throws one triumphantly into the air. As the bone spins in the air, there is a match cut to a much more advanced tool: an orbiting satellite. The match cut helps draw a connection between the two objects as exemplars of primitive and advanced tools respectively, and serves as a neat summary of humanity's technological advancement up to that point. The satellite is unidentified in the film, but the novel makes it clear that it is an orbital weapon platform, thus linking with the use of the bone as a weapon.

Michael Powell and Emeric Pressburger's A Canterbury Tale (1944) is a predecessor for the 2001: A Space Odyssey match cut in which a fourteenth-century falcon cuts to a World War II aeroplane. The sense of time passing but nothing changing is emphasised by having the same actor, in different costumes, looking at both the falcon and the aeroplane.

An early Hollywood example of the technique is the dream sequence in Buster Keaton's 1924 fourth feature film, Sherlock Jr.. The scene contains a number of match cuts as the protagonist's surroundings change sharply around him several times: at one point he dives off a rock into the sea but lands in a pile of snow on a hillside.

Another early example is Orson Welles's Citizen Kane (1941), which opens with a series of match dissolves that keeps the titular character's lit window in the same part of the frame while the cuts take viewers around his dilapidated Xanadu estate, before a final match dissolve takes viewers from the outside to the inside where Kane is dying.

Another match cut comes from Lawrence of Arabia (David Lean, 1962) where an edit cuts together Lawrence blowing out a lit match with the desert sun rising from the horizon. Director David Lean credits inspiration for the edit to the experimental French New Wave. The edit was later praised by Steven Spielberg as inspiration for his own work.

One earlier use of the match cut is shown in Satyajit Ray's film, The World Of Apu (1959). The cut starts from a movie screen, which the couple Apu and Aparna are watching, to the windowpane of the carriage they are returning home in. This technique allows for a rather sound montage, moving from a boy burning in fire in the movie they are watching, to the fire dissolving, and finally, to a rectangular faded glass pane as the camera rolls back and reveals the entire carriage.

A match cut occurs at the end of Alfred Hitchcock's North by Northwest. As Cary Grant pulls Eva Marie Saint up from Mount Rushmore, the cut then goes to him pulling her up to his bunk on the train. The match cut here skips over the courting, the marriage proposal, and the actual marriage of the two characters who had for much of the film been adversaries. Another Hitchcock film to employ the use of a match cut is Psycho. Just after Marion Crane is murdered in the "shower scene", the camera shows blood flowing down the drain of the tub, then cuts (dissolves) to a shot of Marion's eye.

German director Fritz Lang provided early uses of match cuts in his silent and first sound films. In Dr. Mabuse the Gambler, he shows a circular casino from above and cuts to a circle of hands at a seance happening the same night involving Mabuse and others. This smoothly changes into the simultaneous scene and links the two activities as "decadent" pastimes of the rich in pursuit of excitement and celebrity. Lang reused the technique in M while cross cutting between the meetings of Schränker's criminal union and Inspector Karl Lohmann's homicide investigation squad. Schränker and Lohmann are matched in movement and in dialogue (which is carried over the cut to form a coherent phrase) to illustrate their unlikely connection in a shared goal, to capture a serial child killer.

The "Morning in America" campaign commercial for US President Ronald Reagan's successful 1984 re-election bid also uses this technique. Early in the ad there are match cuts between a taxi cab, a tractor, and a bike, all facing the camera with the headlights on. Later there is a match cut between two men, both hoisting the American flag.

For his 1986 fantasy film Highlander, director Russell Mulcahy employs multiple match cuts to indicate movements backwards in time and forwards again to the present day, telling the story of an immortal who relives episodes from his past in the ancient Highlands of Scotland (and later across Europe), as he faces his final challenge in modern New York City. Examples include a World Wrestling Federation match cutting back to the bloody clan battles of his youth, a fish tank cutting back to an experience in a boat on a loch, and an emotional face in the past dissolving into a giant NYC advertising hoarding showing the impassive Mona Lisa. In the case of this film, the match cut is integral to the storytelling, as a potentially confusing back-and-forth narrative is thus held together; with the denouement's final cut to Scotland cleverly revealed to be not a jump in time, as previously, through the inclusion of a modern fighter jet in flight over the Highlands.

In the 1986 film Aliens there is a match cut between a close-up of Ripley's sleeping face and a distant shot of planet Earth.

Yet another example of a match cut can be found in the final episode of the first season of David Lynch and Mark Frost's television show Twin Peaks. In the opening moments as Dr. Jacoby is struck down by a masked assailant and rolls over onto his back, the camera zooms in onto his eye which slowly fades away to a roulette wheel in One Eyed Jack's casino. This transition is a key moment in the episode as it connects two very different story lines together through a strategic cut.

The Simpsons make major usage of the match cut, providing seamless transitions between scenes. Notable examples include the cut from young Homer to current-day Homer in "Bart Star", the transition from Marge to the character in her novel, in "Diatribe of a Mad Housewife", and hundreds more. The usage of the match cut has ultimately become a major recurring trait of the series.

Tarsem Singh's The Fall features a match cut where the costume, hairstyle, and facial expression of a character was matched nearly perfectly to the background of the next scene, without the use of digital enhancement, as well as other examples.

See also 
 Cutting on action
 
 Jump cut
 Split edit

References

Further reading 
 
 
 
 
 

Cinematography
Cinematic techniques
Film editing